Saunders Park may refer to:
Saunders Park (Nova Scotia), municipal park in Halifax
Saunders Park, Philadelphia, neighborhood